Grosstraktor (German: "large tractor") was the codename given to six prototype medium tanks built (two each) by Rheinmetall-Borsig, Krupp, and Daimler-Benz, for the Weimar Republic, in violation of the Treaty of Versailles. Constructed in secret, they were tested by Reichswehr units at the Kama tank school in the Soviet Union.  They were used for training and retired as monuments after the Nazi party came to power.

Development history

After the first World War, Germany realized the value of tanks in warfare. In 1925, plans to design tanks for the Reichswehr were secretly initiated. The Grosstraktor was the first of the tank designs for the Reichswehr.

The Grosstraktor began life when design specifications for a tank known as the "Armeewagen 20" were created in 1926. It was to be a 15 tonne tank armed with a 7.5 cm gun in a fully rotating turret and having a length of 6 meters and a width of 2.4 meters. Contracts to design and build two chassis in soft steel were given to Daimler-Benz, Krupp, and Rheinmetall in March 1927. Krupp designed a turret for their own vehicle, while Rheinmetall designed a turret for both their own and Daimler-Benz's tanks.

Construction of the six Grosstraktor was started at a Rheinmetall shop in Unterlüß in August 1928, and was completed by the end of June 1929. They were then shipped to a secret testing ground near Kazan, Russia for trials, arriving in July 1929. There, Mk 6/380/160 track links replaced the originals.

References

Bibliography

External links
http://www.achtungpanzer.com/leichte-traktor-grosstraktor-i-ii-iii-neubaufahrzeug-pzkpfw-v-vi.htm 

Interwar tanks of Germany
Medium tanks of Germany
Trial and research tanks of Germany